Jake Gannon (born January 25, 1987) is a former professional ice hockey defenseman who played three years in the St. Louis Blues and New York Islanders systems.

Prior to turning professional, Gannon was a two-time captain and four-time academic all conference recipient at Colorado College in the Western Collegiate Hockey Association.

Career statistics

References

External links

1987 births
American men's ice hockey defensemen
Bridgeport Sound Tigers players
Colorado College Tigers men's ice hockey players
Ice hockey players from Illinois
Living people
People from Roselle, Illinois
Peoria Rivermen (AHL) players
Sioux City Musketeers players
Utah Grizzlies (AHL) players